Daniel Halfar (born 7 January 1988) is a German former professional footballer who played as a midfielder.

Career
Born in Mannheim, Halfar began his career at MFC Phönix Mannheim 02.

In 1997, he joined 1. FC Kaiserslautern. He made his debut on 11 December 2005 against Bayern Munich. Ten days later, with Halfar having made three substitute appearances in the Bundesliga, it was announced his first professional contract had been agreed, which would run from 1 January 2006 to 30 June 2010. He scored his first two goals in a match against MSV Duisburg on 4 February 2006. making him the youngest Kaiserslautern player to score (18 years, 28 days). Following his first season, Halfar was seen as a very big talent.

In August 2007 he moved to Arminia Bielefeld. He scored his first goal for his new club on 22 November 2008 against VfB Stuttgart. After three seasons with Arminia Bielefeld and scoring only one goal for the club, he was sold on a free transfer to 1860 Munich. In the summer of 2013 he transferred to 1. FC Köln, signing a three-year contract.

After having played for 1. FC Kaiserslautern between 2015 and 2018, Halfar retired from football in November 2018 due to a hip injury.

International career
Halfar played for the Germany U21 national team.

Career statistics

References

External links
 

1988 births
Living people
Association football midfielders
German footballers
1. FC Kaiserslautern players
1. FC Kaiserslautern II players
Arminia Bielefeld players
TSV 1860 Munich players
1. FC Köln players
Bundesliga players
2. Bundesliga players
Germany under-21 international footballers
Footballers from Mannheim